Julian Ian Charles (born 5 February 1977) is a former footballer from Saint Vincent and the Grenadines who played as a striker.

Career

Club career
Charles moved from Hampton & Richmond Borough to Brentford in December 1999, for a fee of £25,000. While at Brentford, Charles made 12 appearances in the Football League, before later moving to Billericay Town in October 2001. Charles rejoined Ilford in April 2010.

International career
Charles played international football for Saint Vincent and the Grenadines, earning two caps in 2000.

Personal life 
Charles has three brothers, Ian, Darren and Jason, and as of 2002 had a son. Prior to taking up football, Charles was a ski instructor in Switzerland, Italy and Austria. He also holds an HND in Graphic Design, a degree in Design and later worked as a graphic designer. At the time he was playing for Brentford, Charles lived in Newbury Park. He is a Liverpool supporter.

References

External links

Living people
Footballers from Plaistow, Newham
People with acquired Saint Vincent and the Grenadines citizenship
Saint Vincent and the Grenadines footballers
Saint Vincent and the Grenadines international footballers
Cheshunt F.C. players
Grays Athletic F.C. players
Billericay Town F.C. players
Witham Town F.C. players
Barking F.C. players
Hampton & Richmond Borough F.C. players
Brentford F.C. players
Woking F.C. players
Farnborough F.C. players
Weymouth F.C. players
Aylesbury United F.C. players
Leatherhead F.C. players
Wingate & Finchley F.C. players
F.C. Clacton players
Ilford F.C. players
Hounslow Borough F.C. players
Redbridge F.C. players
English Football League players
National League (English football) players
Isthmian League players
1977 births
Association football forwards